The Tucson Ring meteorite is a brezinaite meteorite fragment, first described by Bunch and Fuchs. It was reported as one of several masses of virgin iron found at the foot of the Sierra de la Madera and transported to the plaza of Tucson, Arizona circa 1850, where it was used as an anvil in a blacksmith's shop.

References 

 Meteorites by name
Iron meteorites